Tarok Kolache was a small settlement in Kandahar province, Afghanistan.

On October 6, 2010, Lieutenant Colonel David Flynn, commander of the Combined Joint Task Force 1-320th gave the order to drop  of rockets and aerial bombs on the village which resulted in leveling the village completely.

See also
 Deh Bala wedding party bombing
 Bến Tre
 Khosrow Sofla
 Lower Babur
 Kandahar Province

References

External links
 Images The village before and after the bombing
 The Afghan village that’s been wiped from the map - with 25 tons of coalition bombs
 War Crimes in Afghanistan? Time To Investigate
 Can the U.S. Make Amends After Blowing Up an Afghan Town?
 Afghan villagers dispute U.S. Rationale for bombing

Populated places in Kandahar Province
2010 in Afghanistan
United States military scandals
War in Afghanistan (2001–2021)